Ifeatu Christian-David Melifonwu  (born May 2, 1999) is an American football defensive back for the Detroit Lions of the National Football League (NFL). He played college football at Syracuse and was drafted by the Lions in the third round of the 2021 NFL Draft.

Early years
Melifonwu attended Grafton High School in Grafton, Massachusetts. He played defensive back, running back and wide receiver in high school. A standout athlete, Melifonwu also played basketball, ran track, and even played a year of lacrosse. Melifonwu committed to Syracuse University to play college football.

College career
Melifonwu played at Syracuse from 2017 to 2020. After redshirting his first year in 2017, he played in 29 games over the next three seasons. He finished his career with 88 tackles, three interceptions and one sack. After his junior season in 2020, he declared for the 2021 NFL Draft.

Professional career

Melifonwu was drafted in the third round, 101st overall, by the Detroit Lions in the 2021 NFL Draft. Melifonwu signed his four-year rookie contract with Detroit on July 23, 2021.

On September 22, 2021, Melifonwu was placed on injured reserve after suffering a thigh injury in Week 2. He was activated on November 29. On June 1, 2022, Melifonwu started snaps as both a cornerback and a safety.

Personal life
His brother, Obi Melifonwu, is a former NFL player and currently plays in the USFL.

References

External links
Syracuse Orange bio

1999 births
Living people
Players of American football from Boston
American football cornerbacks
American football safeties
Syracuse Orange football players
Detroit Lions players
People from Grafton, Massachusetts
American people of Igbo descent